Krafft Arnold Ehricke (March 24, 1917 – December 11, 1984) was a German rocket-propulsion engineer and advocate for space colonization. Ehricke is a co-designer of the first Centaur liquid oxygen/liquid hydrogen upper stage.

Biography
Born in Berlin, Ehricke believed in the feasibility of space travel from a very young age, influenced by his viewing of the Fritz Lang film Woman in the Moon. At the age of 12, he formed his own rocket society.  He attended Technical University of Berlin and studied celestial mechanics and nuclear physics under physicists including Hans Geiger and Werner Heisenberg, attaining his degree in Aeronautical Engineering.

He worked at Peenemünde as a propulsion engineer from 1942 to 1945 with Walter Thiel, then went to the United States with other German rocket scientists and technicians under "Operation Paperclip" in 1947. He worked for a short time with the Von Braun Rocket Team at Huntsville.

In 1948, while working for the U.S. Army, Ehricke wrote a story about a crewed mission to Mars called "Expedition Ares".  It anticipated the many challenges that still face explorers who will make the journey in the future. In the same year he wrote a book with Wernher von Braun, The Mars Project, which detailed how man could travel to Mars using a ferry system.

Upon leaving government service in 1952, Ehricke worked at Bell Aircraft, and then moved to Convair in 1954. While at Convair, he designed the D-1 Centaur, the world's first upper-stage-booster that used liquid hydrogen and oxygen. He also created an early space station design, based on launch by Convair's Atlas rocket. The NEXUS reusable rocket was a 1960s concept design by a group at General Dynamics led by Ehricke. Also, during his stay at General Dynamics, he participated on Project Orion (nuclear propulsion).

In 1966, Ehricke was inducted into the International Aerospace Hall of Fame for his engineering achievements and his influential ideas on the purpose of space exploration.

Ehricke undertook a major, multi-decade study of the industrial development of the Moon, which he described as Earth's "seventh continent." His lunar industrialization concept was based on the most advanced technologies, such as nuclear-powered freight transporters, and using fusion energy to power his city, Selenopolis, on the Moon.

He married Ingeborg Ehricke (born 12 September 1922).

Ehricke received a space burial on April 21, 1997, when a rocket sent a small amount of his cremated remains into Earth orbit.

Contributions to space flight dynamics
Ehricke was an accomplished practitioner in the field of astrodynamics and its applications.  His two-volume work entitled Space Flight is probably the most complete and surely the most useful introduction to this complex subject ever written.  It focuses on methods for exploration of the solar system. Although he was not the first, he clearly demonstrated the so-called "gravity assist" method for utilizing hyperbolic encounters with an intermediate planet to increase (or decrease) the velocity and orbital elements of a space vehicle. This technique had opened the entire solar system to robotic exploration by using what he called "Instrumented Comets."  Examples include the Voyager missions to the outer planets and the recent successful New Horizons mission to Pluto. His contribution to this important field of exploration has been neglected for many decades and incorrect claims of "invention" of what is now called gravity assist were made by Minovitch.

Extraterrestrial Imperative
Ehricke promoted a philosophical concept called the "Extraterrestrial Imperative." This idea refers to Ehricke's belief that it was the responsibility of humanity to explore space and exploit the resources of the Solar System, in order to sustain the development of the species. There are no external "limits to growth," Ehricke insisted, because while the Earth is a "closed system," the exploration of space opens the universe to humanity.  For Ehricke, human creativity has no limits.

Further reading

References

External links

 www.hq.nasa.gov
 www.daviddarling.info
 www.tdf.it 
 Ehricke, Krafft@ Astrophysics Data System
 Krafft Arnold Ehricke (in German) from the archive of the Österreichische Mediathek

1917 births
1984 deaths
20th-century German inventors
V-weapons people
German aerospace engineers
German emigrants to the United States
German spaceflight pioneers
NASA people
Engineers from Berlin
People from Huntsville, Alabama
German rocket scientists
Space advocates
American technology writers
German technology writers
Technical University of Berlin alumni
Space burials
Deaths from leukemia
Operation Paperclip
German male non-fiction writers
20th-century American essayists
20th-century American male writers
American male non-fiction writers